Iyad Mando (born February 20, 1978) is a Syrian footballer, who played for Al-Wathba.

Honour and Titles
Al-Wahda
Syrian Premier League (1 title): 2004.
Syrian Cup (1 title): 2003.

Al-Karamah
Syrian Premier League (4 titles): 2006, 2007, 2008, 2009
Syrian Cup (4 titles): 2007, 2008, 2009, 2010
Syrian Super Cup (1 title): 2008
AFC Champions League: 2006 Runner-up
AFC Cup: 2009 Runner-up

References

1978 births
Living people
Syrian footballers
Syria international footballers
Al-Karamah players
Association football midfielders
Sportspeople from Homs
Syrian Premier League players